The 2016–17 Alabama Crimson Tide men's basketball team (variously "Alabama", "UA", "Bama" or "The Tide") represented the University of Alabama in the 2016–17 NCAA Division I men's basketball season. The Crimson Tide played its home games at Coleman Coliseum in Tuscaloosa, Alabama, as a member of the Southeastern Conference. Avery Johnson was in his second year as head coach of the Tide. They finished the season 19–15, 10–8 in SEC play to finish in a tie for fifth place in SEC play. They defeated Mississippi State and South Carolina to advance to the semifinals of the SEC tournament where they lost to Kentucky. They received an invitation to the National Invitation Tournament where they lost in the First Round to Richmond.

Previous season
The Crimson Tide finished the season 18–15, 8–10 in SEC play to finish in 10th place. They defeated Ole Miss in the second round of the SEC tournament to advance to the quarterfinals where they lost to Kentucky. The Crimson Tide received an invitation to the National Invitation Tournament as a #5 seed, where the team lost to Creighton in the first round.

Departures

Incoming Transfers

2016 recruiting class

2017 Recruiting class

Roster

Schedule and results

|-
!colspan=12 style="background:#990000; color:#FFFFFF;"| Exhibition game

|-
!colspan=12 style="background:#990000; color:#FFFFFF;"| Non-conference regular season

|-
!colspan=12 style="background:#990000; color:#FFFFFF;"| SEC regular season

|-
!colspan=12 style="background:#990000; color:#FFFFFF;"| SEC Tournament

|-
!colspan=12 style="background:#990000; color:#FFFFFF;"| National Invitation Tournament

See also
 2016–17 Alabama Crimson Tide women's basketball team

References

Alabama
Alabama Crimson Tide men's basketball seasons
Alabama
Alabama Crimson Tide
Alabama Crimson Tide